Robert Klein (born February 8, 1942) is an American stand-up comedian, singer, and actor. He is known for his appearances on stage and screen. He has released four standup comedy specials: A Child of the 50s (1973), Mind Over Matter (1974), New Teeth (1975), and Let's Not Make Love (1990). The first two albums received Grammy Award for Best Comedy Album nominations. Klein hosted Saturday Night Live in its first season in 1975 and again in 1978. Klein made his Broadway debut in the 1966 production of The Apple Tree opposite Alan Alda. He earned a Tony Award for Best Actor in a Musical nomination for his performance in Neil Simon's musical comedy They're Playing Our Song (1979).

He is known for his film roles in The Owl and the Pussycat (1970), Mixed Nuts (1994), One Fine Day (1996), Primary Colors (1998), The Safety of Objects (2001), Two Weeks Notice (2002), How to Lose a Guy in 10 Days (2003), and Reign Over Me (2007). He is also known for his recurring television roles in Law & Order: SVU (2009-2012), The Good Wife (2013-2014), Madam Secretary (2014) and Will & Grace (2018-2019). He has received two Primetime Emmy Award nominations for his specials, Child in his 50's (2001), and Unfair and Unbalanced (2010). He was profiled in the Starz documentary Robert Klein Still Can't Stop His Leg (2016).

Early life
Klein was born in the Bronx, the son of Frieda (née Moskowitz) and Benjamin Klein, and was raised in a "prototypical 1950s Bronx Jewish" environment, the grandson of Hungarian-Jewish immigrants who arrived in the USA early in the 20th century. He has an older sister, Rhoda.

After graduating from DeWitt Clinton High School, Klein had planned to study medicine; however, he changed his mind during his studies at Alfred University, deciding to go into acting instead.

While studying at the Yale Drama School, Klein learned about an opportunity to audition for The Second City. In a piece he wrote for the improvisational troupe's book, Klein recalled sitting in a room full of other hopefuls, including Fred Willard. Klein's audition consisted of an improvisation set with Willard about two guys in a nightclub, which was successful enough to get Klein and Willard hired by Second City. In the spring of 1965, Klein was chosen as a member of Second City. When he returned to New York City a year later, he was cast by Mike Nichols in the Broadway musical The Apple Tree.

Career

Early work
Klein's first major appearance was as host of the 1970 summer replacement television series Comedy Tonight, on which were introduced many of the routines that in the next few years would be released on record albums. His extensive routines about the Watergate scandal made him highly popular in the 1970s. In 1974, he appeared in an episode of Paul Sand in Friends and Lovers.

Klein starred in HBO's first stand-up comedy special in 1975 during the cable channel's early broadcast days and has continued to appear in several more one-man shows which have typically concluded with his "I can't stop my leg" routine. On 15 November 1975, during Season 1, and again in Season 3, on 28 January 1978, Klein hosted Saturday Night Live. His skits included Tough Director in 1975, Nick The Lounge Singer Sings Star Wars Theme in 1978 and The Olympia Restaurant: Cheeseburger, Chips and Pepsi in 1978.

In 1979, Klein starred in Neil Simon's musical comedy They're Playing Our Song opposite Lucie Arnaz. He received a Tony Award for Best Actor in a Musical nomination. 

In 1985, he starred in the "Wordplay" segment of The Twilight Zone, which cast him against type in a dramatic role. In 1986, Klein had his own late-night talk show, Robert Klein Time, which ran on the USA Network until 1988. The following year, Klein hosted Monty Python Live at Aspen, a reunion and tribute show for the five surviving members of the British comedy troupe, in a special that appeared on HBO in 1998.

Comedy albums 
Klein has released four comedy albums, A Child of the Fifties (1973), Mind Over Matter (1974), New Teeth (1975), and Let's Not Make Love (1990). The first two albums received Grammy Award for Best Comedy Album nominations. 

In A Child of the Fifties (1973, Brut/Buddah Records), shown as Child of the 50s (on the cover), Klein talks about his life as a child in the 1950s: about air raid drills, Johnny Mathis music, showing off condoms while at the high school dance, the high school lunch ladies, Senator Joseph McCarthy, Governor W. Averell Harriman (of New York), meeting Yankee stars, the Yankees losing the World Series, and much more. He also goes into other things that he has observed in his life, such as substitute teaching, 1970s FM radio disc jockeys, late-night delis, and annoying commercials (e.g., Geritol).  He also performed two songs that he wrote himself: "Fabulous '50s"; and "Middle Class, Educated Blues".

His next album, Mind Over Matter (1974), included extensive discussion of the Watergate scandal and another song—the title track—about a kid who turned to humor to become popular.

Klein's follow-up album, New Teeth (1975, Epic/CBS Records), featured the comedian's on-stage work on tracks such as "Mother Isn't Always Right" and his transposition of George Carlin's "Seven Words You Can't Say On Television", titled "Six Clean Words You Can Say Anywhere," with studio-recorded material such as "Continental Steel" and "On the Bayou".

Klein responded to the end of the sexual revolution with his 1990 album, Let's Not Make Love, which contained many of the same routines as his 1984 HBO special Child of the '50s, Man of the '80s and his 1986 special Robert Klein on Broadway.

Film and television 
Klein has appeared in such films as The Owl and the Pussycat (1970), Hooper (1978), The Last Unicorn (1982), Radioland Murders (1994), One Fine Day (1996), Primary Colors (1998), The Safety of Objects (2001), Two Weeks Notice (2002), How to Lose a Guy in 10 Days (2003), and Ira and Abby (2006). Klein had a recurring role in the TV drama series Sisters. In the 1970s, he hosted Saturday Night Live twice. He also appeared as a guest star in the animated series Duckman, in the NBC sitcom Family Ties, and on the CBS sitcom The King of Queens.

In 2005 he launched The Amorous Busboy of Decatur Avenue, his 8th HBO Special

In March 2007, Klein once again collaborated with Adam Sandler (after appearing in Mixed Nuts) in Reign Over Me, and in September 2007 released a new DVD compilation of his eight live HBO specials, entitled Robert Klein: The HBO Specials 1975–2005. Klein starred in The Mysteries of Laura, a crime dramedy on NBC starring Debra Messing. In this series he played the father of the show's main character, Laura. He appeared alongside Messing again in the relaunched version of her sitcom Will & Grace, playing the father of her character, Grace Adler. In 2014, Klein played the Canadian Ambassador on Madam Secretary. Klein played the Mayor of New York City in Sharknado 2: The Second One (2014) and Sharknado 3: Oh Hell No! (2015).

On 29 January 2018, producers announced that Klein would be playing Grace Adler's father Martin in the NBC revival of Will and Grace replacing Alan Arkin. Klein has authored an autobiography, The Amorous Busboy of Decatur Avenue: A Child of the Fifties Looks Back (2006).

Personal life
Klein is divorced from opera singer Brenda Boozer. They have a son, Alexander Stuart Klein, who goes by Allie Klein and performs standup comedy.

Influence
Klein has named Lenny Bruce, Jonathan Winters, and Rodney Dangerfield as comedy influences.

Jerry Seinfeld has stated Klein's influences on him stating "He was The Beatles of Comedy to me". Various comedians including Bill Maher, Billy Crystal, Richard Lewis, and Jay Leno, all have also cited Klein as a comedic influence.

Filmography

Film 

Source: Internet Movie Database and Turner Classic Movies

Television 
{| class="wikitable plainrowheaders" 
|-
! scope="col" style=""|Year
! scope="col" style=""|Title
! scope="col" style=""|Role
! scope="col" style=""|Notes
|-
|1973
! scope="row"| Love, American Style
| Michael
| Epiosde: "Love and the End of the Line" 
|-
|1974
! scope="row"|Paul Sand in Friends and Lovers
| Mike Moran
| Episode: "Moran's the Man"
|-
|1975-1978
! scope="row"|Saturday Night Live
| Host / Himself 
| 2 episodes
|-
|1977
! scope="row"|Visions
|Rebbe
| Episode: "A Secret Space"
|-
|1985
! scope="row"|George Burns Comedy Week
|Jay Miller
| Episode: "Death Benefits" 
|-
|1985
! scope="row"|The Twilight Zone
| Bill Lowery
| Episode: "Wordplay"
|-
|1986
! scope="row"|Comedy Factory
| Robert Morgan
| Episode: "Father's Day" 
|-
|1988
! scope="row"|Family Ties
|Roger Erdman
|Episode: "The Boys Next Door"
|-
|1989
! scope="row"|Murder, She Wrote
|Barney Drake
|Episode: "Trevor Hudson's Legacy"
|-
|1989
! scope="row"|Trying Times
|Buddy Amber
|Episode: "A Good Life"
|-
|1990
! scope="row"|Midnight Caller
|Ryder
|Episode: "Ryder on the Storm"
|-
|1993
! scope="row"|Law & Order
|Rick Mason
|Episode: "Sweeps"
|-
|1993
! scope="row"|Frasier
|Gary
|Voice; Episode: "The Crucible"
|-
|1996
! scope="row"|Grace Under Fire
| Fred Mullens / Ron 
| 2 episodes
|-
| 1996
! scope="row"| Sisters
| Albert Barker
| 25 episodes
|-
|1997
! scope="row"| Duckman
| Uncle Mo Dorkin
| 2 episodes
|-
| 1998
! scope="row"|Dr. Katz, Professional Therapist
| Robert
| Episode: "Old Man"
|-
|1999
! scope="row"|Mad About You
|Stan Freitus
| Episode: "Farmer Buchman"
|-
|1999
! scope="row"|Cosby
| Jack
| Episode: "A Very Nice Dance"
|-
|1999
! scope="row"|The King of Queens
|Bruce Degner
|Episode: "Sparing Carrie"
|-
|2001 
! scope="row"|Oz
|Robert Klein
|Episode: "Conversions" 
|-
|2001
! scope="row"|Bob Patterson
|Landau
|6 episodes
|-
|2004
! scope="row"|The Stones
|Stan Stone
| 7 episodes
|-
|2008
! scope="row"|Life on Mars
|Elliott Casso
|Episode: "Have You Seen Your Mother, Baby, Standing in the Shadows" 
|-
|2008-2010
! scope="row"|Heartland
| Dwayne Trent
| 2 episodes
|-
|2009-2012 
! scope="row"|Law and Order: SVU
|Dwight Stannich
|4 epsides
|-
|2013
! scope="row"|Royal Pains
| Bert
| Episode: "Hammertime"
|-
|2013-2014
! scope="row"|The Good Wife
|Lyle Pollard
| 2 episodes
|-
|2014
! scope="row"|Madam Secretary
| Amb. Lester Clark
| Episode: "Blame Canada"
|-
|2014
! scope="row"|Comedians in Cars Getting Coffee
|Himself
|Episode: "Opera Pimp"
|-
|2014
! scope="row"|Whoopi Goldberg Presents Moms Mabley
|Self
|Documentary 
|-
|2014-2016
! scope="row"|The Mysteries of Laura
|Leo Diamond
|5 episodes
|-
|2014 
! scope="row"|Sharknado 2: The Second One
| The Mayor
| Television movie
|-
|2015
! scope="row"|Sharknado 3: Oh Hell No!
|Mayor of New York
|Television movie
|-
|2015 
! scope="row"|The Seventies
|Self
|Episode: "Television Gets Real"
|-
|2016
! scope="row"|Robert Klein Still Can't Stop His Leg"
|Self
| Starz Documentary 
|-
|2018-2019
! scope="row"|Will & Grace|Martin Adler
| 4 episodes
|-
|2022
! scope="row"|George Carlin's American Dream| Self
| HBO Documentary
|-
|}

Source Internet Movie Database and TV Guide''

Theatre

Comedy specials

Discography

Albums

Awards and nominations

References

External links

Robert Klein Biography from aish.com

1942 births
Living people
20th-century American comedians
20th-century American male actors
21st-century American comedians
21st-century American male actors
21st-century American Jews
Alfred University alumni
American male actors
American male comedians
American male film actors
American male musical theatre actors
American male stage actors
American stand-up comedians
Comedians from New York (state)
DeWitt Clinton High School alumni
Epic Records artists
Jewish American male actors
Jewish male comedians
People from the Bronx
People from Briarcliff Manor, New York
Yale School of Drama alumni